Omar Sebastián Monesterolo (born 30 March 1983 in San Francisco, Argentina) is an Argentine football striker.

Career
Born in San Francisco, Córdoba, Monesterolo began playing football in the youth systems of Boca Juniors and Banfield before debuting in the Torneo Argentino A with his home town's Sportivo Belgrano during 2004. He also played in Torneo Argentino A with Juventud Unida de Gualeguaychú before moving abroad to play in India, Israel, Kuwait, Malaysia and Malta. After returning to Argentina he joined several lower-league sides, including Alem de Río Cuarto, Crucero del Norte, Sarmiento de Leones, Central Norte and 9 de Julio de Rafaela.

In 2005, he was playing for the Malaysian side MPPJ Selangor FC, in the Malaysia Super League.

In 2007/08 he was playing for Valletta FC in the Maltese Premier League.

Montesterolo appeared in seven league matches and two cup matches while playing for Liga Leumit side Hapoel Bnei Lod F.C. during 2008.

 
In 2009, he moved to India and signed with East Bengal, that competes in I-League.

Monesterolo last played for 9 de Julio de Rafaela in Torneo Federal B (the regionalized fourth level of Argentine football) during 2016.

References

1983 births
Living people
People from San Francisco, Córdoba
Argentine footballers
Sportivo Belgrano footballers
Juventud Unida de Gualeguaychú players
Hapoel Bnei Lod F.C. players
Valletta F.C. players
Expatriate footballers in Malta
East Bengal Club players
9 de Julio de Rafaela players
Association football forwards
Sportspeople from Córdoba Province, Argentina